The following communities were founded by the Church of Jesus Christ of Latter-day Saints (LDS Church) in Alberta:
 1887 — Cardston
 1888 — Aeran
 1890 — Mountain View
 1891 — Beazer
 1893 — Leavitt
 1897 — Kimball
 1898 — Caldwell, Magrath, Stirling, Taylorville
 1901 — Orton, Raymond
 1902 — Frankburg, Taber
 1908 — Glenwood
 1910 — Hillspring

The following communities were founded by LDS Church members or missionaries: 
 Woolford
 Jefferson
 Del Bonita

See also
 Mormon colonies in Mexico
 Mormon Corridor
 Mormon Trail (Canada)
 The Church of Jesus Christ of Latter-day Saints in Canada

External links
 Multicultural Canada
 Land of Opportunity - The Great Migration - Mormon Settlers
 Canada, LDS Pioneer Settlements in Canada
 Canada Mormon Trail

 
Mormonism and polygamy
Geography of Alberta
Religion and geography
Cultural regions